Dr.Thusitha Wijemanne is a Sri Lankan politician and a member of the Parliament of Sri Lanka. She was elected from Kegalla District in 2015. She is a Member of the United National Party.

References

Living people
Members of the 15th Parliament of Sri Lanka
Members of the Sabaragamuwa Provincial Council
Sinhalese politicians
United National Party politicians
Women legislators in Sri Lanka
Year of birth missing (living people)